What's Love? is the second album released by Juju under label Sony Music Associated Records.

Track listing

Charts
Oricon Sales Chart (Japan)

References 

2009 albums
Japanese-language albums
Juju (singer) albums
Onenation albums